"Stimpy's Invention" is the final episode from the first season of The Ren & Stimpy Show. It originally aired on Nickelodeon in the United States on February 23, 1992.

Plot
Stimpy – portrayed here as more intelligent than usual – goes on a spree of creating useless and impractical inventions, which enrages Ren. Concerned that Ren is unhappy in life, Stimpy invents a Happy Helmet that forces Ren very much against his will to be happy. Reduced down to a slave, Ren performs various duties for Stimpy while steadily losing his mind. In an attempt to make Ren feel happier, Stimpy plays a record of his favorite song, The Happy Happy Joy Joy Song, which consists of a folk singer making nonsensical statements at random and mindlessly repeating the line "happy happy joy joy". Ren and Stimpy dance manically to The Happy Happy Joy Joy Song. While Stimpy is distracted dancing to his favorite song, Ren uses a hammer to smash in the Happy Helmet and his own head. Free of the Happy Helmet, an extremely livid Ren attacks Stimpy and then decides that being angry and unhappy makes him truly happy, and thanks Stimpy for it.

Cast
John Kricfalusi – voice of Ren.
Billy West – voice of Stimpy.

Production
The episode had a very troubled production, taking a year to complete from the beginning of production in February 1991 until it aired a year later in February 1992. 
The story had its origins in 1990 when Bob Camp developed the idea of a story called Stimpy's Inventions in which Ren serves as an unwilling guinea pig for Stimpy's impractical inventions. John Kricfalusi was greatly taken with Camp's idea. Camp later stated that Kricfalusi "fell in love with the idea, that he constantly refined everything in it to the point of ridiculousness, until everything was perfect". Kricfalusi changed the focus on the story as Camp stated that he told him: "Look, why don't we have him [Ren] have a real fit and go insane at one point, and then Stimpy decides he's going to make an invention that's going to cure Ren?". Kricfalusi developed the idea of the Happy Helmet that enslaves Ren, and to make the focus of the story Ren's struggle for freedom.

The executives at Nickelodeon greatly disliked the concept of the story and were loath to approve the story, which was felt to be inappropriate for children. The executives wanted to have the scenes where Stimpy uses a duck as a tool; Ren whacks Stimpy with a folded newspaper; and where Ren laughs so hysterically that his head splits into two removed. Some of the more extreme elements of the story were removed, but much of the material that the executives objected was not removed, and was aired. Vincent Waller stated the network executives disliked Stimpy's use of a duck to solder together the Happy Helmet out of the belief that this might inspire children to likewise try to use ducks as tools, and wanted Stimpy to use a woodpecker instead as the tool. Kricfalusi sent out a memo that stated the animation team was going to draw a duck, not a woodpecker as the tool. Kricfalusi stated in an interview: "It took longer because it took them forever to approve it. They wanted me to throw it out completely when they saw the storyboard – they just did not get it. Finally, I had to throw myself on my knees and just beg Vanessa [Coffey] to let me do it". Vanessa Coffey, the producer of The Ren & Stimpy Show, admits to having disagreements with Kricfalusi over the contents of the story, but denies Kricfalusi's claim that she wanted to veto the episode. Several scenes were censored, most notably the scene where Ren under the control of the Happy Helmet submissively licks Stimpy, which did not make it past the storyboard phase. 

The storyboard phase of the episode started in late 1990 and was finished by late February 1991. Most of the cartoonists who worked in the episode have stated that it was Kricfalusi's obsessive perfectionism and micro-management leadership style that delayed the production. Stimpy's Invention was scheduled to premiere in October 1991, but did not premiere until February 1992 due to the production delays. Camp stated about the production: "We killed ourselves on it. That's why we never finished it. We kept fucking with it and fine-tuning it. That show was the magical combination. It was my drawings coupled with John being fanatical about this cartoon and not letting up on any point, beating everybody to death to get perfection".

Kricfalusi's insistence on drawing and redrawing many of the scenes himself greatly hindered production. One scene, where Stimpy presents his "Stay-Put Socks" to Ren, took an entire month to complete as Kricfalusi kept changing his mind about the color of the box that held the socks despite the box being shown for only a few seconds. The show's painter, Teale Wang, painted 50 different versions of the box in different colors and shades until Kricfalusi finally chose Wang's first painting of the box. Wang reported that she felt that Kricfalusi was even then not pleased about the coloring of the box. Likewise, another animator, David Koenigsberg, recalled that Kricfalusi would explode in rage at him over his coloring of the Happy Helmet, and that it seemed that he could never quite color the Happy Helmet in a manner that was satisfactory to Kricfalusi. The production on Stimpy's Invention was so far behind in August–September 1991 that the Carbunkle studio in Vancouver that had been hired as a subcontractor for the animation were forced to temporarily fire much of their staff as there was not enough material arriving from California to justify paying for a full staff. Despite the services of Carbunkle studio, much of the work on Stimpy's Invention was done at the Spümcø studio in Los Angeles under the watchful eyes of Kricfalusi. To the considerable annoyance of the other cartoonists who worked on the episode, Kricfalusi started to personally redraw much of the episode himself in October 1991, at a time when the episode was already supposed to have been aired.

By November 1991, Howard Baker had resigned as the overseas supervisor and Bob Jaques was hired to go to the Philippines to oversee the inking of the episode by the Fil-Cartoons studio of Manila. When Jaques arrived in Manila in November 1991, he reported that much of the footage had been ruined due to incompetence, and he had to redo much of the episode himself using the original pencil drawings. Jaques reported that the Filipino cartoonists of Fil-Cartoons were inept and that many of the visual flaws in Stimpy's Invention was due to their poor workmanship. The frequent delays on Stimpy's Invention led Nickelodeon to present it as a "lost episode" of The Ren & Stimpy Show when it finally aired on 23 February 1992.

Reception
The American scholar Thad Komorowski called Stimpy's Invention among the best of the show, with "an ideal balance of genuine turmoil with uproarious comedy". The American journalist Joey Anuff wrote that Stimpy's Invention was Kricfalusi's "finest moment". The American scholar Sarah Banet-Weiser wrote that Stimpy's Invention, when it aired in 1992, was a refreshing change from the banal and bland cartoons of the 1980s. Banet-Weiser wrote that much of the dialogue in Stimpy's Invention, such as Ren's threat "you filthy swine, I will kill you!", would not have been aired in a 1980s cartoon. Banet-Weiser noted that the episode cheerfully satirized many of the conventions of modern American culture, such as Stimpy's use of a duck and a beaver as tools which mocked the "no testing on animals" disclaimer often used in American marketing. Banet-Weiser noted that Stimpy's Invention lampooned the ideals of happiness and conformity in modern American culture as it is being unhappy that makes Ren happy and the Happy Helmet is a form of slavery as Ren no longer has control of his mind and his emotions after Stimpy places it on his head. 

Much of the story of Stimpy's Invention is a parody of the idea popular in certain quarters that being perpetually happy should be the norm for everyone. Likewise, the story satirizes the belief that any form of sadness is a mental disorder that needs to be whisked away via a regime of drugs and therapy. The Happy Helmet appears to be a metaphor for the way that some American parents have their children constantly take anti-depressant drugs regardless if they are needed or not as a way to ensure permanent happiness. The over-prescription of anti-depressants for children, especially in the United States, has been described as a "crisis" with 1 out of every 12 American children taking some form of anti-depressant drugs, in many cases due to vague diagnosis of some psychological disorder. One example of the extent of the level of anti-depressant drugs in modern United States is the level of anti-depressants discovered in the brains of the fish of the Great Lakes. The number of American adults who take anti-depressant drugs rose from being 7.7% of all American adults in 1999–2002 to being 12.7% in 2011–2014. As the anti-depressant drugs pass out of human bodies via sanitation systems into the Great Lakes, this has resulted in the fish of the Great Lakes have twenty times the level of anti-depressants in their brains than what are in the water, leading to the fish being exceedingly happy and hence less risk-averse, to the extent of damaging the fish populations. 

Komorowski noted the story of Stimpy's Invention is a story about freedom as Ren asserts his identity in face of Stimpy's efforts to impose his version of happiness on him, noting in particular that there is nothing that indicates that Ren likes the song Happy Happy Joy Joy, but he is forced to dance to that song under the control of the Happy Helmet because it is Stimpy's favorite song. Komorowski noted that Ren under the Happy Helmet was being "tortured, physically and mentally" while Stimpy was completely "oblivious" to the pain he had inflicted on him and was quite surprised when he learned at the climax that Ren was angry with him. Komorowski argued that Stimpy displayed a parental love and concern for Ren as he only wanted him to be happy, but that he went about helping his friend in a manner that was brutal and callous, albeit only because Stimpy was so lost in his "brainless ecstasy" that he was incapable of understanding the pain and torment that he has inflicted.

Banet-Weiser noted that Ren under the dominance of the Happy Helmet has an unnaturally wide, crazed smile perpetually stuck on his face with bloodshot eyes while he attends happily to Stimpy's utterly repulsive desideratum of needs such as cleaning Stimpy's filthy litterbox and his equally filthy underwear. Banet-Weiser noted the song Happy Happy Joy Joy is, despite its title, rather menacing as the singer threatens at one point: "I don't think you're happy enough. I'll teach you to be happy!" Banet-Weiser wrote: "The transgressing of boundaries of taste and convention in Ren & Stimpy is playful; Stimpy's Invention consciously mocks the authenticity of 'being happy', so that the unofficial anthem of Ren & Stimpy, Happy Happy Joy Joy, is provocatively ironic." The phrase "happy happy joy joy" introduced in Stimpy's Invention has entered the English language as a slang term to describe someone being forced to feign happiness and to hide their own unhappiness in order to conform. The 2020 documentary Happy Happy Joy Joy: The Ren and Stimpy Story took its title from the song. In a review of Happy Happy Joy Joy, the British critic Andrew Pulver wrote: "Here is a documentary whose title contains radioactive levels of irony: happiness and joy are very far from what is to be found within".

Books

Links
Happy Happy Joy Joy

References

The Ren & Stimpy Show
1992 American television episodes
Television episodes about technology
Works about emotions